Sielce is a neighborhood in Mokotów district of Warsaw, Poland.

Sielce is roughly bounded on the North by Podchorążych Street, the East by Czerniakowska Street, the South by Beethhovena Street, and the West by Sobieskiego Street. Its northwest corner adjoins the Royal Baths Park, also known as Park Łazienkowski, on the southwest side, with two entrances to the park (one from Gagarina Street, and one on Podchorążych).

History 
In 1412, Duke Janusz I gave the dean of the chapter collegiate St. John a portion of land lying in the north of Siedlce (Sielce). It became the property of the church and survived until confiscation by the Prussian government during the Third Partition of Poland in 1795.

A small-sized village (5 fiefs in 1528) together with Czerniakow and Czarnów once constituted a whole. 
There was a farm and Wójtostwo (town), in the sixteenth century a clothier lived in Sielcach.

In the first half of the nineteenth century, part of the land Sielc belonged to Grand Duke Constantine Pavlovich of Russia. 
In 1820 he married Joanna Grudzińska, who died shortly after her husband died in 1831.  They left a will in which his Polish estates  - including Sielce - were bequeathed to Nicholas I of Russia, who was also King of Poland at the time.

Sielce became a part of Warsaw in 1916. At the same time, the former "Principe" street was renamed Chelmska, "Lazienkowska - Nabielaka," Long "- Iwicka," garden "-Czerska," Shared "- MAGNUSZEWSKI (then Gagarin)," Okopowa "- Cadet. 
These changes marked the start of the area's transformation from a rural habitat used for recreation into a more urbanized and industrialized area. The decision to join Warsaw was made by Hans Hartwig von Beseler, the German governor of then-occupied portions of the Kingdom of Poland (1916–1918), including Warsaw.

Warsaw Uprising: taken from T. Kondracki's article
July 1944: Orders for Uprising to begin are given
August 1944: Most resistance overcome by Germans, Ochota is last to fall. Sewers used extensively by resistance Home Army fighters.
September: German forces continue pushing outwards from Old Town. Struggle for Czerniakow begins September 12. September 16–19, Germans subdue Sadyba and Sielce areas as Russians begin making bridgeheads across Vistula. September 26, Germans focus offensive on pacifying Upper Mokotow area and clearing out sewers.

1949: a Documentary and Feature Film center is located at Chelmska 21

1953–66: Architectural firm of Zofii Krzymuskiej-Fafius (Szczecin), George and John Zdanowicz Baumiller formed a settlement near the area of "Sielce" by Lusitanian-Czerska-Chelmska-Sielecka streets.

Planning 

Forum Sielce (in Polish) for discussion planning in Sielce

External links
 Forum Sielce (in Polish) for discussion planning in Sielce

Neighbourhoods of Mokotów